Amity University, Mumbai (AUM) is a private university located in Bhatan Village of Panvel, Navi Mumbai, Maharashtra, India. It was established in 2014 by the Ritnand Balved Education Foundation.

Recognition
It is a State-Private University, established under Government of Maharashtra Act No. 13 of 2014 and is recognised by the University Grants Commission.

Campus 
The campus of the university is located in the village Bhatan at Raigad district, connected to Mumbai-Pune expressway near the city of Panvel. It includes indoor and outdoor sports facilities, and residential accommodation for staffs and students.

Academics
The university offers academic programs in the various fields, at both undergraduate and postgraduate levels including honors levels, besides offering doctoral degrees in several disciplines.

Amity Institute of Travel and Tourism (AITT)

 Under Graduate
 Bachelor of Tourism and Travel Management
 Post Graduate
 Master of Tourism and Travel Management

Amity Business School (ABS)

 Under Graduate
 B.Com (Hons)
 BBA
 BBA 3 Continent
 BBA International
 BBA Real Estate and Urban Infrastructure
 BBA Banking and Finance
 Post Graduate
 MBA
 MBA 3 Continent
 MBA International
 MBA Construction Project Management
 MBA Banking and Finance
 MBA Insurance
 MBA Logistics and Supply Chain Management
 MBA Real Estate and Urban Infrastructure
 PG Diploma in General Insurance
 Doctoral
 Ph.D Build Environment
 Ph.D Build Environment (Part Time)
 Ph.D in Management (Marketing/Finance/HR/IT)
 Ph.D in Management (Marketing/Finance/HR/IT) - Part Time

Amity School of Communicans (ASCO)

 Under Graduate
 B.A Multimedia and Gaming
 B.Sc Animation and VFX
 B.A Film Making
 B.A Journalism and Mass Communication
 B.A Journalism and Mass Communication (3 Continent)
 B.A Journalism and Mass Communication (International)
 Post Graduate
 M.A Advertising and PR
 M.A Film and TV
 M.A Journalism and Mass Communication
Doctoral
Ph.D in Journalism and Mass Communication
Ph.D in Journalism and Mass Communication (Part Time)

Amity School of Behavioral and Allied Sciences (AIBAS)

 Under Graduate
 B.A (Hons) Applied Psychology
 B.Sc Clinical Psychology
 Post Graduate 
 M.Phil Clinical Psychology
 M.Sc Psychology
 Doctoral
 Ph.D Psychology
 Ph.D Psychology (Part Time)

Amity Law School (ALS)

 Under Graduate
 B.A LL.B (Hons)
 B.Com LL.B (Hons)
 B.Sc LL.B (Hons)
 BBA LL.B (Hons)
 Post Graduate
 LL.M
 LLB
 Doctoral
 Ph.D Law
 Ph.D Law (Part Time)

Amity Institute of Languages and Liberal Arts (AILA)

 Under Graduate
 B.A (H) Liberal Arts
 B.A (Hons) English
 B.A (Hons) French
 Bachelor of Social Work
 Post Graduate
 Master of Social Work
 Doctoral
 Ph.D Economics
 Ph.D Economics (Part Time)
 Ph.D Political Science
 Ph.D Political Science (Part Time)

Amity School of Fashion Design and Technology (ASFDT)

 Under Graduate
 B.Des Fashion Communication
 B.Des Fashion Design
 B.Des Fashion Design (3 Continent)
 B.Des Fashion Styling and Image Design
 B.Des Textile Product Design
 Post Graduate
 M.Des Fashion Technology
 Doctoral
 Ph.D Fashion Management
 Ph.D Fashion Design (Part Time)

Amity School of Fine Arts (ASFA)

 Under Graduate
 Bachelor of Fine Arts
 Post Graduate
 Master of Fine Arts

Amity School of Architecture and Planning (ASAP)

 Under Graduate
 Bachelor of Architecture
 Bachelor of Interior Design
 Bachelor of Planning

Amity Institute of Biotechnology (AIB)

 Under Graduate
 B.Sc (Hons) Biotechnology
 B.Tech Biotechnology
 B.Tech+M.Tech Biotechnology (Dual Degree)
 Post Graduate
 M.Sc Biotechnology
 M.Tech Biotechnology
 M.Tech Food Biotechnology
 M.Tech Environmental Biotechnology
 Doctoral
 Ph.D Biotechnology
 Ph.D Biotechnology - Part Time
 Ph.D Environmental Biotechnology
 Ph.D Environmental Biotechnology (Part Time)
 Ph.D Green Technology
 Ph.D Green Technology (Part Time)

Amity School of Applied Sciences (ASAS)

 Under Graduate
 B.Sc (Hons) Chemistry
 B.Sc.(Hons) Mathematics
 B.Sc (Hons) Physics
 Bachelor of Statistics
 Post Graduate
 M.Sc Applied Chemistry
 M.Sc Applied Mathematics
 M.Sc Applied Physics
 Doctoral
 Ph.D Chemistry
 Ph.D Chemistry (Part Time)
 Ph.D Mathematics
 Ph.D Mathematics (Part Time)
 Ph.D Physics
 Ph.D Physics (Part Time)
 Ph.D Environmental Sciences
 Ph.D. Environmental Sciences (Part Time)

Amity Institute of Information Technology (AITT)

 Under Graduate
 B.Sc Information Technology
 Bachelor of Computer Applications
 Post Graduate
 Master of Computer Applications
 Doctoral
 Ph.D Information Technology
 Ph.D Information Technology (Part Time)

Amity Institute of Technology (AIT)

 Under Graduate
 B.Tech Automobile Engineering
 B.Tech Aeronautical Engineering

Amity School of Engineering and Technology (ASET)

 Under Graduate
 B.Tech Civil Engineering
 B.Tech Civil Engineering (3 Continent)
 B.Tech Computer Science & Engineering
 B.Tech Computer Science & Engineering (3 Continent)
 B.Tech Computer Science & Engineering (International)
 B.Tech Electrical & Electronics Engineering
 B.Tech Electronics & Communication Engineering
 B.Tech Electronics & Communications Engineering (3 Continent)
 B.Tech Aerospace Engineering
 B.Tech Mechanical Engineering
 B.Tech Mechanical Engineering (3 Continent)
 Post Graduate
 M.Tech Mechanical Engineering
 M.Tech Computer Science & Engineering
 M.Tech Computer Science Engineering (International)
 Doctoral
 Ph.D. Aerospace Engineering
 Ph.D Aerospace Engineering (Part Time)
 Ph.D Civil Engineering
 Ph.D Civil Engineering (Part Time)

References

External links
 
 RICS SBE Amity University 

Private universities in India
Universities in Mumbai
2014 establishments in India
Educational institutions established in 2014